These are the late night schedules on all three networks for each calendar season beginning September 1983. All times are Eastern/Pacific.

PBS is not included, as member television stations have local flexibility over most of their schedules and broadcast times for network shows may vary, CBS and ABC are not included on the weekend schedules (as the networks do not offer late night programs of any kind on weekends).

Talk/variety shows are highlighted in yellow, network news programs in gold, and local news & programs are highlighted in white background.

Monday-Friday

Saturday

Sunday

By network

ABC

Returning Series
Nightline

New Series
ABC Rocks
Eye on Hollywood

Not Returning From 1982-83
One on One
The Last Word

CBS

Returning Series
The CBS Late Movie
CBS News Nightwatch

NBC

Returning Series
Friday Night Videos
Late Night with David Letterman
NBC Late Night Movie
NBC News Overnight
Saturday Night Live
The Tonight Show Starring Johnny Carson

Not Returning From 1982-83
SCTV Network 90

United States late night network television schedules
1983 in American television
1984 in American television